A choreographic sequence is a required element for figure skating in all international competitions. It is required in the free skating programs of senior and junior single skaters and in the free skating programs of senior pair skaters. It is also required during ice dancers' rhythm dances and free dances. Judges do not evaluate individual elements in a choreographic sequence; rather, they note that it was accomplished. Skaters must fulfill certain requirements to fulfill the highest points possible during choreographic sequences. There are six types of choreographic elements in ice dance: the Choreographic lift, the Choreographic spinning movement, the Choreographic assisted jump movement, the Choreographic twizzling movement, the Choreographic sliding movement, and the Choreographic character step sequence.

Background 
A choreographic sequence is a required element for figure skating in all international competitions. According to the International Skating Union (ISU), the organization that oversees the sport, a choreographic sequence "consists of any kind of movements like steps, turns, spirals, arabesques, spread eagles, Ina Bauers, hydroblading, any jumps with maximum of 2 revolutions, spins, etc." Senior single skaters and junior and senior pair skaters must include one choreographic sequence in their free skating programs. The ISU may require the element in ice dancers' rhythm dances; it is always required during their free dances.

Judges do not evaluate individual elements in a choreographic sequence; rather, they note that it was accomplished. For example, any spin or any single and double jumps included in a choreographic sequence are not included in the final score. If a skater performs a jump with more than two revolutions, the sequence is considered ended. There are no restrictions, but the sequence must be clearly visible. The technical panel identifies when a choreographic sequence begins, at its first movement, and ends, which occurs when the skater prepares to perform the next element if it is not the last element of the program. It can be executed before or after the step sequence.

Single skaters must include the following in order to earn the highest points possible during choreographic sequences: it must have originality and creativity, the sequence must match the music; and their performance must be effortless throughout the entire sequence, with good energy, execution, and flow. They must also have the following: good precision and clarity; skaters must use the entire ice surface; and skaters must demonstrate "excellent commitment" and control of their whole body while performing their choreographic sequences. Pair skaters, in order to earn the most points possible, must include the following: it must have originality and creativity; the sequence must match the music and reflect the program's concept and character; and demonstrate effortlessness of the element as a sequence. They must also do the following: use the entire ice surface; demonstrate good unison between the partners; and demonstrate "excellent commitment" and control of the whole body.

Choreographic elements in ice dance 
There are six types of choreographic elements in ice dance. The Choreographic lift is a dance lift lasting from a minimum of three seconds to a maximum of ten seconds. It must be performed after all the other required dance lifts. Teams can execute the Choreographic spinning movement at any time during their program and both partners must perform at least two continuous rotations in any hold. The partners must also be on the same axis, which may be moving, and must be executed on either one foot, two feet, when the partner is elevated for less than two rotations, or a combination of the three. A Choreographic assisted jump movement is at least three assisted jump movements (the same or different), performed at any time during the program and performed continuously, one after the other. The assisted partner, who can be either the man or the woman, must not rotate over one rotation in each assisted jump movement by the partner doing the assisting and the assisted partner must be off the ice for less than three seconds. The Choreographic twizzling movement is performed after the required set of twizzles. It is composed of two parts. For the first part, there must be at least two continuous rotations performed at the same time and both partners must be travelling (i.e., "cannot be on the spot"). For the second part, at least one partner must perform at least two continuous rotations, with   a maximum of three steps between the first and second twizzling movement. Either one or both partners can be on the spot or traveling, or a combination of both. Both parts must be on one foot, two feet, or a combination of both.

The Choreographic sliding movement is "a controlled sliding movement across the ice on a part of the body by either partner". It must last for at least two seconds, and ice dance teams may execute it at any time during the program, at the same time, and on any part of the body. The ISU states that "the start and ending of the Choreographic Sliding Movement does not have to be performed simultaneously". It can be performed in hold or not touching, or a combination of both, and can also rotate. If the skaters complete, as a stop, a controlled sliding movement on two knees or if they sit and/or lie on the ice, it will be deemed as a Choreographic sliding movement and a deduction for a fall and/or illegal element will be applied. The Choreographic character step sequence, which may be executed at any time in the program, must be done around the rink's short axis (within ten meters on either side of the short axis) and must be skated from barrier to barrier (when at least one partner is not over two meters from each barrier). It can be executed while either in hold or not touching, and a dance team can touch the ice, with controlled movements, with any part of their body. They can be a maximum of four arms lengths, or four meters, apart.

References

Works cited 

 "Communication No. 2334: Single and Pair Skating". (ISU 2334) Lausanne, Switzerland: International Skating Union. 8 July 2020. Retrieved 27 July 2022.
 "Special Regulations & Technical Rules Single & Pair Skating and Ice Dance 2021". (S&P/ID 2021) International Skating Union. June 2021. Retrieved 25 July 2022.

External links 

 Victoria Sinitsina and Nikita Katsalapov executing a Choreographic spinning movement (YouTube clip). Retrieved 4 August 2022.

Figure skating elements